The Chinese Regional Bishops' Conference (CRBC), is the episcopal conference of Taiwan and is the highest organ of the Roman Catholic Church in Greater China. Catholics in the independent jurisdictions of Hong Kong, Macau and Mongolia are represented in the Federation of Asian Bishops' Conferences, not the Chinese Regional Bishops' Conference.

History
When Archbishop Paul Yü of Nanking attended the Second Vatican Council in 1965, Pope John XXIII proposed the development of the Chinese Catholic Church on Taiwan due to the situation of the Church on Mainland China. Part of this development would be to re-establish Catholic schools such as the Catholic University in Peking on Taiwan as well as creating a Chinese episcopal conference. Therefore, the Chinese Catholic Bishops Conference (天主教中國主教團) was established in 1967 and would serve as the national bishops' conference for all territories claimed by the Government of the Republic of China. In 1973, bishops from Taiwan, Hong Kong, Macao, Japan, Korea, Vietnam, and the Philippines gathered at Fu Jen Catholic University for the inaugural meeting of the Federation of Asian Bishops' Conferences. In 1998, the conference adopted its current name to reflect the geopolitical situation and remains the only Chinese episcopal conference sanctioned by the Vatican.

Organizational structure
The conference is led by a president, vice president, and secretary-general. The Secretariat, the highest administrative unit, contains the following 10 commissions:

Aborigine Apostolate
Clergy
Subcommittee on Ongoing Priest Formation
Subcommittee on Seminaries Education
Doctrine of the Faith and Catechetical Instruction
Sub-Commission of Bible Apostolate
Chinese Catholic Federation for the Bible Apostolate
Subcommittee on Catechesis Research
Subcommittee on Theology Research
Catholic Charismatic Renewal Service Team
Education and Culture
Evangelization
Subcommittee on Family
Subcommittee on Laity
Subcommittee on Youth
Interreligious Dialogue and Ecumenical Cooperation
Promoting Christian Unity
Pastoral Care of Migrants and Itinerant People
Pastoral - Health Care
Sacred Liturgy
Social Development (Justice & Peace)

Membership List
President: Most Reverend John Lee Keh-Mien (李克勉), Bishop of Hsinchu

Vice President: Most Reverend Peter Liu (劉振忠), Bishop of Kaohsiung

Most Reverend Thomas Chung An-zu (鍾安住), Archbishop of Taipei
Most Reverend Philip Huang (黃兆明), Bishop of Hualien
Most Reverend John Baptist Tseng (曾建次), Auxiliary Bishop of Hualien
Most Reverend Martin Su Yao-wen (蘇耀文), Bishop of Taichung
Most Reverend Bosco Lin Chi-nan (林吉男), Bishop of Tainan
Most Reverend John Hung, S.V.D. (洪山川), Archbishop Emeritus of Taipei
Most Reverend Joseph Ti (狄剛), Archbishop Emeritus of Taipei
Most Reverend Joseph Cheng (鄭再發), Archbishop Emeritus of Taipei
Most Reverend Luke Liu (劉獻堂), Bishop Emeritus of Hsinchu
Most Reverend James Liu (劉丹桂), Bishop Emeritus of Hsinchu

Note: The Archbishop of Taipei has also overseen the Apostolic Administration of Kinma since 1968.

See also
Republic of China - Holy See relations
Roman Catholicism in China
Roman Catholicism in Taiwan
Christianity in China

References

External links
 (Chinese)
Chinese Regional Bishops' Conference webpage. GCatholic.org website
Apostolic Nunciature of China webpage. GCatholic.org website

Taiwan
Catholic Church in China
Catholic Church in Taiwan
Christian organizations established in 1967